Baguio's at-large congressional district refers to the lone congressional district of the Philippines in the city of Baguio. It has been represented in the House of Representatives of the Philippines since 1992. It was previously included in Benguet's 1st congressional district from 1987 to 1992. The district is currently represented in the 18th Congress by Marquez Go of the Nacionalista Party (NP).

Representation history

Election results

2022

2019

2016

2013

2010

References 

Congressional districts of the Philippines
1943 establishments in the Philippines
At-large congressional districts of the Philippines
Congressional districts of the Cordillera Administrative Region
Constituencies established in 1943
Constituencies disestablished in 1944
Constituencies established in 1984
Constituencies disestablished in 1986
Constituencies established in 1992